Rachel Renee Hardeman is an American public health academic who is Associate Professor of Division of Health Policy and Management at the University of Minnesota. She holds the inaugural Blue Cross Endowed Professorship in Health and Racial Equity. Her research considers how racism impacts health outcomes, particularly for the maternal health of African-Americans.

Early life 
Hardeman is from Minneapolis. She initially studied chemistry and Spanish at the Xavier University of Louisiana. After graduating she moved to the ELAM (Latin American School of Medicine) Cuba in Havana. It was in Cuba that she first experienced a more patient-centered model of healthcare, which focused on prevention and the bond between patients and doctors. She moved to the University of Minnesota for her graduate studies, where she earned a Master's of Public Health in Public Health Administration and Policy before completing a doctoral degree in Health Services Research and Policy with a focus on the sociology of health and illness and population health. Her doctoral research considered the intersection of race, gender and socioeconomic status in medical education.

Research and career 
Hardeman studies the social determinants of health, making use of intersectionality theory to better understand health disparities. Her research revealed that in Minnesota African-American women are two times as likely as white women to die during childbirth. Hardeman believes that doulas, non-medical birthing coaches, could improve the medical outcomes of Black mothers. In 2016 Hardeman launched a programme that looked at racial inequality in birth outcomes. As part of the programme, Hardeman studied best practise at the African-American owned Roots Community Birth Center. Roots was founded by Rebecca Polston, the only African-American midwife in Minnesota, and provides culturally centered care to African-American communities.

Alongside working to support African-American mothers, Hardeman has worked to reform medical schools to ensure that their students are trained to provide equitable care to all patients. Working with the physician and sociologist Brooke Cunningham, Hardeman developed a new medical school curriculum that looks to reduce health disparities.

Hardeman is involved with medical research, education and policy. She became concerned that the changes to Title X proposed by the Trump administration would have significant consequences for marginalised communities, “It’s an issue of reproductive justice and health equity. Denying patients who are disproportionately poor, young and of racial [and] ethnic minorities access to reproductive health services is an injustice and an act of violence,”.

During the COVID-19 pandemic Hardeman investigated the impact of coronavirus disease on communities of colour. She believed that the disproportionate impact of coronavirus disease on ethnic minorities was exposing what was broken about United States healthcare, arguing that it could provide an opportunity “to build a new system,”. In response to the murder of George Floyd, Hardeman and Rhea Boyd called police violence and structural racism a public health crisis. Together they wrote “The choice before the health care system now is to show, not tell, that Black Lives Matter,”. She argued that contact tracing, considered by many to be essential to mitigating excess coronavirus disease deaths, would be difficult in communities that were deeply distrustful of institutions, particularly as they responded to police brutality. Hardeman said that whilst social media had exposed police brutality and offered a tool for organising, “Having to relive those incidents over and over again is incredibly harmful for mental health and emotional wellbeing,”.

Awards and honours 
 2015 Health Affairs Most Read Blog Post
 2016 American Board of Internal Medicine John A. Benson Jr., MD Professionalism Article Prize
 2016 Association of Medical Education in Europe Research Paper Award
 2019 University of Minnesota Josie R. Johnson Human Rights and Social Justice Award
 2019 ASSPH Early Career Public Health Research Award
 2020  Alice S. Hersh Emerging Leader Award from AcademyHealth

Selected publications

References 

Living people
Year of birth missing (living people)
People from Minneapolis
Academics from Minnesota
African-American women academics
American women academics
African-American academics
University of Minnesota faculty
Xavier University of Louisiana alumni
University of Minnesota School of Public Health alumni
21st-century African-American people
21st-century African-American women